Eudonia owadai is a moth in the family Crambidae. It was described by Sasaki in 1998. It is found in Taiwan.

References

Moths described in 1998
Eudonia